The Cathedral of the Immaculate Conception is a historic cathedral at 307 Congress Street in Portland, Maine that serves as seat of the Diocese of Portland. The pastor is Bishop Robert Deeley, and the rector is Father Seamus Griesbach. The church, an imposing Gothic Revival structure built in 1866–69, was listed on the National Register of Historic Places in 1985. It is the tallest building in Portland and the third tallest in Maine.

Architecture and history
The Roman Catholic diocese complex occupies most of a city block, bounded by Cumberland Avenue, Locust Street, Congress Street, and Franklin Street. The main church building is set on the northwest side of the property, facing Cumberland Avenue, while the parish hall extends northeast from its rear, and the bishop's residence stands to its southeast, facing Congress Street. To the left (south) of the residence stands a two-story school.

The church is an imposing masonry structure, built of red brick, with sandstone trim and a slate roof. The main façade has a central entrance recessed in a sandstone Gothic arch, with a large stained glass rose window above. The main tower rises to the right of the main entrance, with buttressed corners, narrow Gothic windows, and an octagonal spire.  Windows on the side walls are also Gothic, with buttressing between.

Construction began in 1866 under the supervision of New York architect Patrick Keely. Construction of the church was interrupted by Portland's great 1866 fire, and it was not completed until September 8, 1869.The cathedral has undergone restorations in 1921, 1969, and 2000.  In 1985, it was added to the National Register of Historic Places. The secondary buildings all have stylistically similar Gothic features.

See also
List of Catholic cathedrals in the United States
List of cathedrals in the United States
National Register of Historic Places listings in Portland, Maine
List of tallest buildings in Maine

References

External links

 Official Cathedral Site
 Diocese of Portland Official Site

Churches in the Roman Catholic Diocese of Portland
Churches on the National Register of Historic Places in Maine
Gothic Revival church buildings in Maine
Roman Catholic churches completed in 1866
19th-century Roman Catholic church buildings in the United States
Churches in Portland, Maine
Immaculate Conception, Portland
1866 establishments in Maine
National Register of Historic Places in Portland, Maine
Roman Catholic churches in Maine
Cathedrals in Maine